Mr. Bean's Holiday is a 2007 comedy film directed by Steve Bendelack and written by Hamish McColl and Robin Driscoll, from a story penned by Simon McBurney. Based on the British sitcom series Mr. Bean created by Rowan Atkinson and Richard Curtis, it is a standalone sequel to Bean (1997). The film stars Atkinson in the title role, with Max Baldry, Emma de Caunes, Willem Dafoe and Karel Roden in supporting roles. In the film, Mr. Bean wins a trip to Cannes, France, but on his way there, he is mistaken for both a kidnapper and an award-winning filmmaker when he travels with both a Russian filmmaker's son and an aspiring actress in tow.

Produced by StudioCanal, Working Title Films and Tiger Aspect Films, the film was theatrically released in the United Kingdom on 30 March 2007 and in the United States on 24 August 2007 by Universal Pictures. It received mixed reviews from critics, though it was generally considered to be an improvement over its predecessor. The film was also a commercial success, having grossed $232.2 million worldwide against a $25 million budget.

Plot

On a rainy day in London, Mr. Bean wins a holiday trip to Cannes, a video camera, and €200 in a raffle. Upon arriving in France, Bean causes chaos while trying French seafood cuisine at Le Train Bleu and asks Russian film director, Emil Duchevsky, to film him boarding his train using his video camera at the Gare de Lyon. However, the two keep doing retakes at Bean's request until the train leaves with Bean and Duchevsky's son, Stepan, onboard and Duchevsky left behind.

Bean and Stepan bond and get off together at the next station, where Duchevsky's train passes through the station without stopping; he holds up a sign with a mobile phone number written on it for Stepan to call, but due to inadvertently obscuring the last two digits, Bean unsuccessfully calls the number numerous times. Bean and Stepan board the next train stopping, but are ejected as Bean had accidentally left his wallet, passport and ticket on the telephone booth.

To earn money, Bean busks as a mime/singer and buys himself and Stepan food and bus tickets to Cannes. However, Bean's ticket gets caught in the wind and onto the foot of a chicken, which is then packed into a farmer's truck that Bean chases via bicycle to a farm, where he is unable to retrieve his ticket due to the large number of chickens there. Deciding to continue his journey alone on foot, Bean wakes up on a quaint French village under attack from Nazi soldiers, which is revealed to be the set of a yogurt commercial directed by American filmmaker Carson Clay. Bean briefly stars in the commercial as one of the soldiers before being dismissed for showing his video camera in the advert, and accidentally causes the set to explode while recharging his camera.

Continuing to hitchhike, Bean is picked up by a Mini identical to his own driven by aspiring actress Sabine, who is on her way to the Cannes Film Festival, where her debut film directed by Carson, Playback Time, is to be presented. The pair stop at a café, where Bean reunites with Stepan and Sabine decides to take him with them, believing Stepan to be Bean's son. The next morning, the trio arrive in Cannes thanks to Bean driving through the night after Sabine falls asleep.

At a petrol station, Sabine sees on the news that she and Bean are suspected of kidnapping Stepan. In a rush to Playback Time'''s premiere which is starting in merely an hour, she decides not to head to the police to clear the misunderstandings and instead has Bean and Stepan disguised as her mother and daughter to avoid detection at the festival. During the premiere, the audience initially showcases disinterest in the film, and Sabine discovers that her role has been cut, prompting Bean to plug his video camera into the projector and replace the film's visuals with his video diary. The camera's footage of Bean's shenanigans surprisingly align well with the film's narration, and Carson, Sabine and Bean all receive a standing ovation while Stepan is reunited with his parents.

Bean exits through the theatre's back door and finally arrives at the Cannes beach as desired, where he, Sabine, Stepan, Carson, and a group of other people mime a large musical finale to the song "La Mer".

After the credits, Bean can be seen writing "FIN" in the sand with his foot. As soon as he finishes, the camera runs out of battery.

Cast

 Rowan Atkinson as Mr. Bean
 Emma de Caunes as Sabine
 Max Baldry as Stepan Duchevsky
 Willem Dafoe as Carson Clay
 Jean Rochefort as the Maître d'Hôtel
 Karel Roden as Emil Duchevsky
 Steve Pemberton as The Vicar
 Catherine Hosmalin as Ticket Inspector
 Urbain Cancelier as Bus Driver
 Stéphane Debac as Traffic Controller
 Julie Ferrier as The First AD
 Lily Atkinson as Lily

Production

Plans for a second Mr. Bean film were first revealed in February 2001, when Rowan Atkinson - who was filming Scooby-Doo at the time - was lured into developing a sequel to Bean (1997), from a script written by Mr. Bean co-creator Richard Curtis that would have followed Mr. Bean heading to Australia under the working title Down Under Bean. No further announcements regarding the film were made until in early 2005.

In March 2005, the film was officially announced, then titled Bean 2, with Simon McBurney, co-founder and artistic director of the Théâtre de Complicité theatre company, writing the film's script. In December of that year, Atkinson announced that he would script the film himself alongside Curtis, though the final screenplay was instead written by Robin Driscoll (a writer on the TV series) and Hamish McColl, while McBurney wrote the film's story and served as one of the executive producers on the film alongside Curtis.

Principal photography for the film began on 15 May 2006 and took place on location across England and France, particularly during the 2006 Cannes Film Festival. At that point, the film's title was changed from Bean 2 to French Bean, and later to Mr. Bean's Holiday, a reference to the 1953 French comedy film Monsieur Hulot's Holiday, whose title character served as an inspiration to the character of Mr. Bean.

Atkinson reflected in 2022 that since he was neither an athlete nor a cyclist, he found the cycling sequence to be the most difficult thing he had ever done as Mr. Bean.

Deleted scenes
The film features twelve deleted scenes, all of which are included in the film's home media releases:
 On the train, Bean accidentally spills some coffee on a laptop in front of two sleeping men. He cleans it up by wiping the keyboard with his hands, leaving just as one of the two men wakes up and blames the other for destroying his laptop. This scene was featured on trailers and TV spots for the film, while the European release of the film has it in place of the vending machine scene. 
 An extended version of Bean's walk across France where he sees Stepan for the first time looking out a car window.
 Bean tricks a man to get a train ticket for himself and staying with Stepan on the train.
 Bean carries Stepan on his back all the way through a French plaza. 
 Bean continues his journey on foot through a large field of sunflowers, which then transitions to the scene where he tries to hitchhike. In an extended version of that scene, he films himself doing silly moves in the middle of the road using his video camera (which is later shown in Carson Clay's Playback Time in the film's final cut).
 Taking place before the scene where he gets picked up by Sabine, Bean performs shadow play on the road.
 An extended version of Bean's car ride with Sabine where the latter leaves her Mini emotionally and almost gets run over by a truck after lying down on the road. 
 An extended version of the café scene where Bean mimes his journey to Stepan prior to reuniting with him, which transitions to the scene where Sabine meets Stepan and the group dances at the cafe.
 Taking place in the scene where Sabine stops at a petrol station to change for the premiere, Bean tricks a man into making the cost of his car's refueling higher, by immediately getting the fuel nozzle once the man places it back on the gas pumps (unbeknownst to the man) and plugging it into Sabine's Mini.
 Taking place during the premiere of Playback Time, Bean enters the projection room, where he falls asleep while sitting down to watch the film. He then leans on the rolling projector's wheel, causing it to stop and the film to stop rolling, get tangled up and cut, which causes Bean to wake up and try sticking the film back together. After initially succeeding in fixing the film, Bean then accidentally causes the projector to lower down. This is then followed by Carson discovering the film roll accumulating in the projection room and trying to fix the film and lower the projector back up. The damaged film is still seen lying next to the projector in the final cut, though it remains unexplained. 
 The original ending of the film had Bean dancing at the beach with a band, which was replaced by Bean, Sabine, Stepan and the rest of the film's characters singing "La Mer".

Music
The film score was composed and conducted by Howard Goodall, who also composed the original Mr. Bean series, although the original Mr. Bean theme was unused. In contrast to the series' use of simple musical repetitions, the film uses a symphonic orchestration, which is a sophisticated score that features catchy leitmotifs for particular characters or scenes. The film's theme song was "Crash" by Matt Willis.

Release
TheatricalMr. Bean's Holiday served as the official film for Red Nose Day 2007, with money made from the film going to the telethon's charity Comic Relief. Prior to the film's release, a new and exclusive Mr. Bean sketch titled  Mr. Bean's Wedding was broadcast on the telethon for Comic Relief on BBC One on 16 March 2007.

The official premiere of the film took place at the Odeon Leicester Square on Sunday, 25 March and helped to raise money for both Comic Relief and the Oxford Children's Hospital. Universal Pictures released a teaser trailer for the film in November 2006 and launched an official website online the following month.

Home mediaMr. Bean's Holiday was released on both DVD and HD DVD on 27 November 2007. The DVD release is in separate widescreen and pan and scan formats in the United States. The DVD charted at No. 1 on the DVD chart in the United Kingdom on its week of release. Following the 2006-08 high-definition optical disc format war, the film was released on Blu-ray in the United Kingdom on 18 October 2010. The film was then released on Blu-ray for the first time in the United States on 16 April 2019.

Reception
Box officeMr. Bean's Holiday opened in the United States on 24 August 2007 alongside War and The Nanny Diaries, and grossed $9,889,780 in its opening weekend while playing in 1,714 theaters, with a $5,770 per-theater average and ranking fourth at the box office. The film then closed on 18 October 2007 with a final domestic gross of $33,302,167 and a final international gross of $198,923,741. Culminating in a worldwide total of $232,225,908, the film has become commercially successful considering its $25 million budget. The film was released in the United Kingdom on 30 March 2007 and topped the country's box office for the next two weekends, before being dethroned by Wild Hogs.

Critical response
On Rotten Tomatoes, the film has an approval rating of 51% based on 115 reviews with an average rating of 5.40/10. The site's critical consensus reads, "Mr. Bean's Holiday means well, but good intentions can't withstand the 90 minutes of monotonous slapstick and tired, obvious gags." On Metacritic, the film has a score of 56 out of 100 based on 26 critics, indicating "mixed or average reviews". Audiences polled by CinemaScore gave the film an average grade of "B" on an A+ to F scale.

BBC film critic Paul Arendt gave the film 3 out of 5 stars, saying that, "It's hard to explain the appeal of Mr. Bean. At first glance, he seems to be moulded from the primordial clay of nightmares: a leering man-child with a body like a tangle of tweed-coated pipe cleaners and the gurning, window-licking countenance of a suburban sex offender. It's a testament to Rowan Atkinson's skill that, by the end of the film he seems almost cuddly." Philip French of The Observer referred to the character of Mr. Bean as a "dim-witted sub-Hulot loner" and said the plot involves Atkinson "getting in touch with his retarded inner child". French also said "the best joke (Bean on an old bike riding faster than a team of professional cyclists) is taken directly from Tati's Jour de Fete." Wendy Ide of The Times gave the film 2 out of 5 stars and said "It has long been a mystery to the British, who consider Bean to be, at best, an ignoble secret weakness, that Rowan Atkinson's repellent creation is absolutely massive on the Continent." Ide said parts of the film are reminiscent of City of God, The Straight Story and said two scenes are "clumsily borrowed" from Pee-wee's Big Adventure. Ide also wrote that the jokes are weak and one gag "was past its sell-by date ten years ago".

Steve Rose of The Guardian gave the film 2 out of 5 stars, saying that the film was full of awfully weak gags, and "In a post-Borat world, surely there's no place for Bean's antiquated fusion of Jacques Tati, Pee-Wee Herman and John Major?", while Colm Andrew of the Manx Independent said "the flimsiness of the character, who is essentially a one-trick pony, starts to show" and his "continual close-up gurning into the camera" becomes tiresome. Peter Rainer of The Christian Science Monitor gave the film a "B" and said, "Since Mr. Bean rarely speaks a complete sentence, the effect is of watching a silent movie with sound effects. This was also the dramatic ploy of the great French director-performer Jacques Tati, who is clearly the big influence here." Amy Biancolli of the Houston Chronicle gave the film 3 out of 4 stars, saying "Don't mistake this simpleton hero, or the movie's own simplicity, for a lack of smarts. Mr. Bean's Holiday is quite savvy about filmmaking, landing a few blows for satire." Biancolli said the humour is "all elementally British and more than a touch French. What it isn't, wasn't, should never attempt to be, is American. That's the mistake made by Mel Smith and the ill-advised forces behind 1997's Bean: The Movie."

Ty Burr of The Boston Globe wrote, "Either you'll find [Atkinson] hilarious—or he'll seem like one of those awful, tedious comedians who only thinks he's hilarious." Burr also said "There are also a few gags stolen outright from Tati", but concluded "Somewhere, Jacques Tati is smiling." Tom Long of The Detroit News said, "Watching 90 minutes of this stuff—we're talking broad, broad comedy here—may seem a bit much, but this film actually picks up steam as it rolls along, becoming ever more absurd." and also "Mr. Bean offers a refreshingly blunt reminder of the simple roots of comedy in these grim, overly manufactured times."

Suzanne Condie Lambert of The Arizona Republic wrote, "Atkinson is a gifted physical comedian. And the film is a rarity: a kid-friendly movie that was clearly not produced as a vehicle for selling toys and video games", but also said that "It's hard to laugh at a character I'm 95 percent sure is autistic." Lawrence Toppman of The Charlotte Observer gave the film 2½ stars out of 4 and said "If you like [the character], you will certainly like Mr. Bean's Holiday, a 10-years-later sequel to Bean. I found him intermittently funny yet almost unrelentingly creepy", and also "Atkinson doesn't have the deadpan elegance of a Buster Keaton or the wry, gentle physicality of a Jacques Tati (whose Mr. Hulot's Holiday inspired the title). He's funniest when mugging shamelessly..."

Ruthe Stein of the San Francisco Chronicle said that "the disasters instigated by Bean's haplessness quickly become tiresome and predictable" but said that one scene later in the film "is worth sticking around for". Elizabeth Weitzman of the New York Daily News gave the film 2 out of 4 stars and said "If you've never been particularly fond of Atkinson's brand of slapstick, you certainly won't be converted by this trifle." and also "If the title sounds familiar, it's because Atkinson intends his movie to be an homage to the 1953 French classic Mr. Hulot's Holiday. Mr. Hulot was played by one of the all-time great physical comedians, Jacques Tati, and that movie is a genuine delight from start to finish. This version offers a few laughs and an admirable commitment to old-fashioned fun." Phil Villarreal of the Arizona Daily Star gave the film 2 stars and said "If you've seen 10 minutes of Rowan Atkinson's Mr. Bean routine, you've seen it all", and "The Nazi stuff is a bit out of place in a G-rated movie. Or any movie, really", later calling Atkinson "a has-Bean". Claudia Puig of USA Today gave the film 1½ stars out of 4 and said "If you've been lobotomised or have the mental age of a kindergartener, Mr. Bean's Holiday is viable comic entertainment" and also, "The film, set mostly in France, pays homage to Jacques Tati, but the mostly silent gags feel like watered-down Bean."

Accolades
Max Baldry was nominated for Best Performance in a Feature Film – Supporting Young Actor at the 29th Young Artist Awards in 2008. The film was nominated as Comedy or Musical and Best Comedy'' at the First National Movie Awards in 2007.

References

External links

 
 
 
 
 

2007 films
2007 comedy films
2000s comedy road movies
2000s children's comedy films
British comedy road movies
British children's comedy films
British sequel films
2000s French-language films
2000s Russian-language films
Films about film directors and producers
Films about vacationing
Films based on television series
Films produced by Tim Bevan
Films produced by Eric Fellner
Films set in Cannes
Films set in France
Films set in London
Films set in Paris
Films set in a movie theatre
Films set on beaches
Films shot in France
Films shot in London
Cannes Film Festival
Mr. Bean
Camcorder films
Rail transport films
StudioCanal films
Working Title Films films
Tiger Aspect Productions films
Universal Pictures films
2000s English-language films
2000s British films